Brett Kolste Miller (born October 2, 1958) is a former American football offensive tackle who played ten seasons in the National Football League. He was the weekend sports anchor for KTLA's Prime News.

External links
Bio from 1992 Jets yearbook

1958 births
Living people
People from Lynwood, California
Sportspeople from Los Angeles County, California
Players of American football from California
American football offensive tackles
Iowa Hawkeyes football players
Atlanta Falcons players
San Diego Chargers players
New York Jets players